Paulo Sokoli (born 29 March 1995) is an Albanian professional footballer who most recently played as a defender for Swiss club La Chaux-de-Fonds.

Club career

Early career

Genoa
Being a regular starter with primavera team of Genoa C.F.C. he gained entry with the first team in September 2013 as he called up by the coach Fabio Liverani to participate in the 5th game week of the 2013–14 Serie A against Udinese on 28 September 2013. In that match Sokoli remained as an unused substitute for the entire match wearing the 44th shirt number and Udinese won 1–0 scoring with Antonio Di Natale in the 79th minute. He managed to participate with the first team also in the next fixture 4 days later against Napoli and two others during the next year 2014 in January and May, but didn't came in to play in any of these matches.

Barletta
On 10 July 2014 Sokoli left Genoa to start a professional career at Lega Pro (former Serie C) side S.S. Barletta Calcio. During his first months at Barleta, Sokoli remained with primavera team and involved with the first team on 19 October 2014 by the coach Marco Sesia against Casertana, match finished in the 2–1 loss and Sokoli remained as an unused substitute. He then appeared again at the first team only in the 2015 year in the first match of the year against Messina on 11 January 2015 where he didn't play once again. Then he returned to participate with the first team in March without playing the entire match against Casertana before he made his first professional debut on 11 March 2015 against Matera coming on as a substitute in the 85th minute in place of Simone Guarco in a 2–1 away loss.

FC La Chaux-de-Fonds 
On 19 December 2016 Sokoli signed with FC La Chaux-de-Fonds in the Swiss Promotion League, but he left them at the end of the season.

International career
Sokoli was called up for the first time in international level at Albania national under-17 football team by the coach Džemal Mustedanagić to participate in the 2012 UEFA European Under-17 Championship qualifying round in the month October 2011. He managed to play two full 90-minutes matches and helped his team to gain their qualification to the next Elite round by taking the second place in the rank of the group.

Also in the Elite round in March 2012 Sokoli played two full 90-minute matches but Albania U17 eliminated from the tournament finishing in the 3rd place.

Following his good performances with Albania under-17, Sokoli received a call up highery at Albania national under-19 football team by the coach Foto Strakosha, for the 2014 UEFA European Under-19 Championship qualifying round. He played every minute of all 3 matches of the tournament but Albania u19 got eliminated finishing in the last 4th place of the group collecting 2 points.

Career statistics

Club

References

External links

1995 births
Living people
Footballers from Shkodër
Albanian footballers
Association football defenders
Albania under-21 international footballers
Albania youth international footballers
A.S.D. Barletta 1922 players
A.C. Monza players
FC La Chaux-de-Fonds players
Serie C players
Albanian expatriate footballers
Albanian expatriate sportspeople in Italy
Expatriate footballers in Italy
Albanian expatriate sportspeople in Switzerland
Expatriate footballers in Switzerland